Mr. Immortal (Craig Hollis) is a fictional superhero appearing in American comic books published by Marvel Comics. He is the leader of the Great Lakes Avengers.

The character made his live-action debut in the Marvel Cinematic Universe television series She-Hulk: Attorney at Law, played by David Pasquesi.

Publication history
Created by John Byrne, he first appeared in The West Coast Avengers #46 (July 1989).

Fictional character biography

Origin
The cosmic entity Deathurge first appeared to Craig shortly after his birth and the death of his mother, who made Deathurge promise that he would look after Craig. Craig would dub Deathurge, "D'urge", and the two became the best of friends. His father believed Deathurge to be an imaginary friend, even after Craig's numerous forays into apparently dangerous behavior, such as playing in traffic, which were urged on by Deathurge, which Craig would explain to his father by saying, "Just playin' with D'urge, daddy." On Craig's eighth birthday, Deathurge goaded Craig into setting his house on fire, and then hiding under it as it burned, an event that killed his father. Deathurge stopped visiting Craig afterwards, and Craig was moved into a new home. His foster father, Mr. O'Doughan, was an abusive man, though Craig became close to his foster sister, Terri, the two eventually falling in love as adults. This ended with Terri's suicide, prompting the return of Deathurge. The grief-stricken Craig begged Deathurge to take him as well as Terri, but Deathurge refused and departed again. Craig attempted the first of a number of suicide attempts by jumping off a building, only to discover with this and subsequent attempts using other methods, that he could not die.

The Great Lakes Avengers
With this ability, he takes on the codename Mr. Immortal. In his first outing as a superhero, trying to foil a bank robbery, Mr. Immortal is shot and left for dead. He decides that forming a team will allow him to apply his abilities more usefully. After placing an ad, he founds the Great Lakes Avengers, a regional offshoot of the Avengers based in Milwaukee, Wisconsin, with Mr. Immortal as leader. Its other founding members include Flatman, Doorman, Big Bertha, Dinah Soar and Leather Boy. Although he is given to fits of rage upon regaining consciousness following otherwise-fatal injuries, his teammate and sometimes lover Dinah Soar can utter vocalizations that can calm him. On account of his immortality, he often engages in life-endangering stunts, and is invariably willing to take on the deadliest aspects of missions, which he does brazenly, at one point taunting an armed gunman by saying, "All you're threatening me with is death. And dying's what I do best!" It is also a cause for depression, in particular on occasions when someone close to him dies.

The team first encounters the Avengers when they are lured to the Germania Building by Hawkeye and Mockingbird, who become their mentors. They helped Hawkeye and the West Coast Avengers against "That Which Endures." They also assisted Mockingbird in a holding action against Terminus. After aiding the Thunderbolts against the villain Graviton, the team clashes with the mercenary Deadpool. When not fighting crime, they mostly spend their time playing cards.

Over that time, Mr. Immortal would develop a loving relationship with his teammate, Dinah Soar, as he was also the only one who could understand her language. It is revealed that they are soulmates, and he was her ageless-love, as she herself also possessed a degree of immortality. In the 2004 "Avengers Disassembled" storyline, Craig comes close to quitting the team, but changes his mind by the end of that storyline. In their following outing against Maelstrom, Dinah Soar is killed and Deathurge appears to take her away to the afterlife, truly terminating his and Mr. Immortal's former "friendship". Mr. Immortal would meet Deathurge again at Dinah Soar's funeral, where Deathurge expressed his regret, showing that he had truly come to love Mr. Immortal like a son. Mr. Immortal, however, is enraged at Deathurge, having taken away all that Mr. Immortal had ever cared about, and attacks Deathurge, to no avail. Craig then falls into a deep depression, repeatedly getting drunk and killing himself inside GLA headquarters while wearing a Dinah Soar "costume", as the others watch. He is later killed by Leather Boy, who infiltrated the team's headquarters disguised as Doctor Doom and killed Monkey Joe, Squirrel Girl's sidekick.

Mr. Immortal is able to return the favor when Deathurge appears to take away Monkey Joe to the afterlife in the form of a squirrel, leaving him in a vulnerable state. Deathurge then revealed to Mr. Immortal what his destiny was: to outlive everyone as the one true immortal, and then learn the grand secret that will reveal itself at the end of things, in addition revealing Mr. Immortal not to be either Homo sapiens or homo superior, but rather Homo supreme: a being that has evolved past death itself, making him the ultimate human. Deathurge, by taking away some of his loved ones, tried to prepare Mr. Immortal so that he could truly live to that destiny, but this is jeopardized by the supervillain Maelstrom, who threatens to destroy the entire universe. This gives Mr. Immortal a new incentive to live, and he sets out to stop Maelstrom and save the universe. The GLA confront Maelstrom, who in the course of the conflict, commits suicide. The GLA, however, gain no recognition and circumstances force them to cease using the Avengers name. After discovering that they were all mutants, the team decides to change their name to the Great Lakes X-Men, and adopt new costumes.

GLX-Mas Special
During the GLX-Mas Special, the team confronted Dr. Tannenbaum, who had released an army of living Christmas trees on the citizens of Wisconsin. Later, Mr. Immortal saves Squirrel Girl's new sidekick, Tippy Toe, from Deathurge who was trying to kill her, as part of a test given to him by Oblivion, in order to regain his job.

Great Lakes Champions
The team is invited to the annual superheroes poker tournament. In the end, Flatman wins the tournament with a straight-flush, beating the Thing's four fours. Because the team is discouraged from using the names X-Men or Defenders by those teams, its members are inspired to rename themselves the Great Lakes Champions, despite protests from former Champions of Los Angeles member Hercules.

The Initiative
Following the 2006 storyline "Civil War", all of the Great Lakes Champions have registered with the United States government as required by the Superhuman Registration Act, as revealed when Deadpool mistakenly attempts to apprehend them for violating the Act, only to be defeated and informed that they had already registered.

Mr. Immortal and his teammates are designated the Initiative group for Wisconsin, for which they are dubbed the Great Lakes Initiative. They are given a rescue mission to save Dionysus after he fell from Mount Olympus and was captured by A.I.M., who plans to use his powers to cause mental instability in all the superheroes they consider a threat. During the task, Deadpool, who had been recruited as a reserve member by Flatman, ambushes him and Mr. Immortal, and dispatches others who attempt to evict him from the team's headquarters. Mr. Immortal helps kick Deadpool out by simply living far into the future. There he encounters a time traveling Squirrel Girl and convinces her she needs to return to the past and evict Deadpool. Squirrel Girl goes back and does exactly that.

Secret Invasion
During the 2008 Secret Invasion storyline, the team confronted a Skrull disguised as Grasshopper, with help from Gravity and Catwalk. While Mr. Immortal was shocked at the discovery, Big Bertha thought it was ridiculously obvious. They later appeared to welcome Gravity as leader of the team, after he was transferred to Wisconsin by Norman Osborn.

Fear Itself
During the 2011 Fear Itself storyline, the team confronts Asbestos Man, who takes advantage of the fear and chaos that is happening. None of the group actually wish to touch the man due to the toxicity of his suit. Mr. Immortal talks him into giving up in return for being remembered by the others.

Great Lakes Avengers (2016 series)
In the ongoing series The Great Lakes Avengers, it is revealed that the team had disbanded and gone their separate ways until Flatman receives a visit from Connie Ferrari, a lawyer representing the real Avengers, who informs him that the GLA has been reinstated as a permanent addition to the Avengers. Flatman reunites with Big Bertha and Doorman, though Mr. Immortal and Squirrel Girl are unreachable. While the team relocates to Detroit, Michigan and arrive at their new headquarters, a factory owned by Tony Stark, it is revealed that Mr. Immortal is buried alive at a cemetery. It is later revealed that he did this as a way to deal with his drinking problem. Mr. Immortal is then brought back to the surface by Doorman, who takes him to help the others, who were arrested after a bar fight and taken to jail. After Connie Ferrari gets the team out, she was able to get Goodness Silva in the group, where she takes on the name of Good Boy. After the team discovers that Dick Snerd shut them down, Mr. Immortal returns and takes Flatman on patrol, where he expresses a desire to turn his life around. During their patrol, Mr. Immortal and Flatman resolve their issues with each other and agree to work together. Returning to HQ, Mr. Immortal and Flatman learn that Bertha and Good Boy brought Dick Snerd (Nain Rogue) hostage. During an argument with Bertha, it is revealed that he had proposed to Bertha, but broke off their engagement when she wanted to return to her modeling career and also because he felt he had moved to soon. When Connie visits their base, Mr. Immortal, Flatman and Bertha attempt to keep Nain's abduction secret but she quickly finds out. After seeing that Good Boy brutalized Snerd, the team drops him off at the hospital.

After Connie tells the team to lie low for a couple of days, Bertha goes to a modeling gig while Mr. Immortal and Flatman are visited by Good Boy's brother Lucky, who tells her that they need to leave town due to what she did to Nain Rogue. Later, while fixing the Flatmobile, Mr. Immortal and Flatman receive a text message from Bertha, who was injured while fighting Dr. Nod and his squad. During the battle, Dr. Nod takes more of the weight-loss supplements, becoming much bigger and monstrous. Mr. Immortal then suggests to the team to perform a maneuver, that has Doorman and Mr. Immortal get inside Dr. Nod's body. Once inside, Mr. Immortal manages to kill Dr. Nod by punching his heart. After their victory, the team is visited by Deadpool who tells them that they've been fired and can no longer use the Avengers name, leaving them confused.

Immortal Hulk
In The Immortal Hulk #20, and #24, the body of Mister Immortal can be seen along with a withered Bruce Banner, after the latter had come in contact with the One Below All, the evil aspect of the One Above All.

Powers and abilities
Mr. Immortal is a mutant with the power of immortality, which allows his body to regenerate from any injury, including ones that would kill ordinary humans. Although injuries that are sufficiently traumatic appear to kill him at least initially, his regenerative power causes him to return to life in anywhere from ten minutes to seconds. This rapid healing manifests itself only in response to nominally fatal injuries: when non-fatally injured, he heals at a normal human rate, though such injuries tend to rapidly heal the next time he dies. This ability seems to be unconscious, since he has tried to commit suicide on numerous occasions, only to walk away unscathed afterwards. He has recovered from being shot, suffocated, stabbed, drowned, crushed, starved, dehydrated, exploded, poisoned, decapitated, irradiated, and incinerated. Upon revival, he is often extremely enraged, due to the pain of death. During Dinah Soar's tenure as his teammate, she could utter a vocalization, inaudible to humans, that could bring him out of this state, which Flatman speculated is hypersonic in nature. Mr. Immortal's body does not age.

While most mutants' powers manifest at adolescence, Mr. Immortal's ability did not become apparent until he first attempted suicide. He regained consciousness minutes after, only to find that he was alive and fully healed. Deathurge once explained to him that he is a mutant, but not Homo sapiens superior, the more familiar subspecies of mutant who has simply taken the next step in evolution, but rather he is the final step in human evolution: a man who has evolved past death itself, and is therefore Homo sapiens supreme. He also explained that he will be around until the end of the universe and the one to whom its final secret will be revealed.

As seen during certain fights in The West Coast Avengers vol. 2 #46 and GLA: Misassembled #4, Mr. Immortal appears to be highly acrobatic and athletic in addition to his mutant power.

In other media
 Mr. Immortal was set to appear in New Warriors, portrayed by Derek Theler, before the series was shelved.
 Mr. Immortal appears in the She-Hulk: Attorney at Law episode "Just Jen", portrayed by David Pasquesi.

See also
 Comic book death

References

External links
 Mister Immortal at Marvel Database
 Mr.Immortal at Comic Vine
 Mister Immortal at Writeups.org

Avengers (comics) characters
Characters created by John Byrne (comics)
Comics characters introduced in 1989
Fictional characters from Milwaukee
Fictional characters with immortality
Marvel Comics characters with accelerated healing
Marvel Comics mutants
Marvel Comics superheroes